Qamdo Bamda Airport , also known as Changdu Bangda Airport, is an airport serving Qamdo (Changdu), Tibet Autonomous Region, China. It is located in the village of Bamda (Bangda).

Background

Runway repairs took place in 2007 and 2013 after decay from the weather. Construction of a new  runway has been completed, and the original  runway has been closed.

Airlines and destinations

See also
List of airports in China
List of the busiest airports in China
List of highest airports

References

Airports in the Tibet Autonomous Region
Airports established in 1994
1994 establishments in China